Jędrzej Grobelny (born 28 June 2001) is a Polish professional footballer who plays as a goalkeeper for Warta Poznań.

Career
On 11 June 2021, Grobelny returned to his childhood club Warta Poznań, signing a three-year contract with the Ekstraklasa side to serve as back-up for Warta's first-choice goalkeeper Adrian Lis.

Career statistics

Club

References

External links

2001 births
Living people
Footballers from Poznań
Polish footballers
Poland youth international footballers
Association football goalkeepers
Pogoń Szczecin players
Miedź Legnica players
Warta Poznań players
Ekstraklasa players
I liga players
III liga players